Yuvaköy can refer to:

 Yuvaköy, Amasya
 Yuvaköy, Çivril